George John Brooke is an English academic, the Rylands Professor of Biblical Criticism and Exegesis Emeritus at the University of Manchester.

Brooke was born in Chichester, England, on 27 April 1952. He attended secondary school as an exhibitioner at Wellington College (1965–1970). He studied Theology at St Peter's College, Oxford (1970–1973); he was awarded a B.A. in 1973 and was awarded both the Junior and Senior Pusey and Ellington Prizes for Biblical Hebrew. After a year at St John's College, Cambridge (1973–1974), where he completed the PGCE, he was awarded a Fulbright scholarship to study for a doctorate at Claremont Graduate School (now Claremont Graduate University), Claremont, California. He completed his Ph.D. studies in 1977 and graduated in 1978. For 1977-1978 he was Junior Fellow at the Oxford Centre for Postgraduate Hebrew Studies. From 1978-1984 he taught the New Testament at Salisbury and Wells Theological College, Salisbury, England, where he also acted as examining chaplain to the Bishop of Salisbury. He was Vice-Principal of the College from 1982-1984.

In 1984 he was appointed as a 'New Blood' Lecturer in Intertestamental Literature at the University of Manchester, England, being promoted to Senior Lecturer in 1994, and to Professor of Biblical Studies in 1997. In 1998 he became the seventh Rylands Professor of Biblical Criticism and Exegesis, a post he held until the end of January 2016. He is now Rylands Professor of Biblical Criticism and Exegesis Emeritus. He was awarded the D.D. (doctor of divinity) by Oxford University in 2010.

References

1952 births
Living people
Alumni of St Peter's College, Oxford
Alumni of St John's College, Cambridge
Claremont Graduate University alumni
Academics of the University of Manchester
British biblical scholars
Presidents of the Society for Old Testament Study